Hunters Point or Hunter's Point or Hunter Point refers to the following places:
Bayview-Hunters Point, San Francisco
Hunters Point Naval Shipyard, another name for the San Francisco Naval Shipyard
Hunters Point, Queens, New York City
Hunterspoint Avenue (LIRR station)
Hunters Point Avenue (IRT Flushing Line)
 Hunter's Point, Quebec, an Indian settlement
Hunter Point (Washington)